Mammut may refer to:

 Mammut, the genus of the extinct mastodon, an elephant relative
 Mammut radar, a German radar
 Mammut Sports Group, a Swiss sports group
 a roller coaster in the German theme park Erlebnispark Tripsdrill
 Mammút, Icelandic indiepop and rock alternative band
 Original name for the 2009 movie Mammoth

See also

 
 
 Mammoth (disambiguation)
 Mastodon (disambiguation)
 Elephant (disambiguation)